Alain Siritzky was a French-American film producer and film distributor in softcore pornography, foremost known as the owner of the Emmanuelle franchise from the 1980s to 2010s.

Early life
Siritzky was born in New York City in 1942 where his French Jewish family, a dynasty of film producers in France, took refuge during World War II. His family moved to Paris when he was a youngster.

Emmanuelle
Siritzky's career took a turn after the first Emmanuelle film produced by Yves Rousset-Rouard was released in 1974. He proceeded to become a co-producer in Emmanuelle 2 with his company ASP (Alain Siritzky Productions). After Rousset-Rouard ended the series with Goodbye Emmanuelle in 1977, Siritzky acquired all filming rights to the character. The first Emmanuelle release by ASP to resurrect the character was Emmanuelle 4 in 1984, which was followed by more than 80 Emmanuelle sequels for film, television and video. Krista Allen, Holly Sampson, and Allie Haze were among the actresses who played the title character.

References

External links

1942 births
2014 deaths
Businesspeople from New York City
Film producers from New York (state)
French film producers
American people of French-Jewish descent
French people of Polish-Jewish descent
French pornographers
American emigrants to France
20th-century American businesspeople